Thomas Ensing (by 1490 – ca. 1539), of Winchelsea, Sussex, was an English politician. He was a Member of Parliament (MP) for Winchelsea in 1529 and 1536.

References

15th-century births
1539 deaths
English MPs 1529–1536
English MPs 1536
People from Winchelsea